Carlotto is an Italian surname. Notable people with this name include the following:

Carlotto, a referent for Johann Carl Loth (baptized 1632 – 1698), German painter 
Estela de Carlotto (born 1930), Argentine human rights activist
Florencia Carlotto (born 1988), Argentine volleyball player
Florencia Carlotto (born 1988), Argentine volleyball player
Laura Carlotto (1955 – 1978), Argentinian revolutionary
Massimo Carlotto (born 1956), Italian writer and playwright
Alessandro Carlotto (born 1984), Italian clown

See also

Carl Otto
Carletto
Carloto
Carlotta (name)
Marie-Arlette Carlotti

Notes